is a 1998 Japan-exclusive soccer simulation video game released for the PlayStation.

Summary

The game starts with two animated/cinematic intro sequences. In the second one, the Agony of Doha is remembered.

See also
List of J. League licensed video games

References

External links
Combination Pro Soccer at GameFAQs
Combination Pro Soccer screenshots at Giant Bomb

1998 video games
Japan-exclusive video games
Kuusoukagaku games
J.League licensed video games
PlayStation (console)-only games
Video games set in Japan
Multiplayer and single-player video games
PlayStation (console) games
Video games developed in Japan